According to data of municipal firm Sofproekt-OGP, the majority of the tallest buildings in Bulgaria are located in the Mladost district, in Sofia.

Completed

Under construction

Proposed

See also
List of tallest buildings in Sofia
List of tallest buildings in the Balkans
List of tallest buildings in Europe
List of tallest buildings in the European Union

References

External links 
 Emporis.com

Bulgaria
Tallest
Bulgaria